Robert  Young (14 November 1796 – 16 November 1865) was an Australian autobiographer/memoirist and Methodist minister. Young was born in Ryton, Durham, England and died in Truro, Cornwall, England.

Robert Young was elected President of the Methodist Conference at Bristol in 1856.

His son Robert Newton Young was elected President of the Methodist Conference at London in 1886.

See also

 William Binnington Boyce

References

Australian autobiographers
Australian Methodist ministers
Australian Methodists
Australian people of English descent
1796 births
1865 deaths
Presidents of the Methodist Conference